Ailapuram is a village situated at 5.5 km from Suryapet town in Nalgonda district, Telangana, India.

References

Villages in Nalgonda district